Ugo Tosetto (born August 1, 1953 in Cittadella) is a retired Italian professional football player.

Career
Tosetto began playing football with lower-level sides SPAL, Solbiatese and Monza. He scored 27 goals for Monza in the two seasons he played for them, first leading them to promotion to Serie B and then narrowly missing out on promotion to Serie A. He was bought by Milan after that season, where he would make his Serie A debut against Fiorentina on 11 September 1977. He did not score any league goals in the season he played for the club, his only Milan goal was the one he scored in the 1977–78 European Cup Winners' Cup game against Real Betis. In total, Tosetto played 2 seasons (42 games, no goals) in the Serie A for A.C. Milan and Avellino.

References

1953 births
Living people
Italian footballers
Serie A players
S.P.A.L. players
A.C. Monza players
A.C. Milan players
U.S. Avellino 1912 players
L.R. Vicenza players
Modena F.C. players
Benevento Calcio players
Rimini F.C. 1912 players
A.S.D. SolbiaSommese Calcio players

Association football midfielders